Zykovka is a rural locality and the administrative center of Glebovsky Selsoviet Rural Settlement, Fatezhsky District, Kursk Oblast, Russia. Population:

Geography 
The village is located on the Shmarny Brook (a link tributary of the Usozha in the basin of the Svapa), 110 km from the Russia–Ukraine border, 41 km north-west of Kursk, 7 km east of the district center – the town Fatezh.

 Climate
Zykovka has a warm-summer humid continental climate (Dfb in the Köppen climate classification).

Transport 
Zykovka is located 7 km from the federal route  Crimea Highway as part of the European route E105, 21 km from the road of regional importance  (Kursk – Ponyri), 7 km from the road  (Fatezh – 38K-018), on the road of intermunicipal significance  (M2 "Crimea Highway" – Zykovka – Maloye Annenkovo – 38K-039), 23 km from the nearest railway station Vozy (railway line Oryol – Kursk).

The rural locality is situated 42.5 km from Kursk Vostochny Airport, 164 km from Belgorod International Airport and 225 km from Voronezh Peter the Great Airport.

References

Notes

Sources

Rural localities in Fatezhsky District